PCA may refer to:

Medicine and biology 
 Patient-controlled analgesia
 Plate count agar in microbiology
 Polymerase cycling assembly, for large DNA oligonucleotides
 Posterior cerebral artery
 Posterior cortical atrophy, a form of dementia
 Protein-fragment complementation assay, to identify protein–protein interactions
 Protocatechuic acid, a phenolic acid.
 Personal Care Assistant, also known as unlicensed assistive personnel
Procainamide

Military and government 
 EU-Armenia Partnership and Cooperation Agreement (PCA agreement between Armenia and the EU)
 Parks Canada Agency
 Partnership and Cooperation Agreement (EU)
 Permanent change of assignment in US armed forces

Organizations

Business 
 Packaging Corporation of America
 Peanut Corporation of America, former company
 Pennsylvania Central Airlines 1936-1948

Education 
 Pacific Coast Academy, fictional school in TV series Zoey 101
 Parents and citizens associations for schools in Australia
 Paris College of Art
 Pensacola Christian Academy, Florida, US
 Peoples Christian Academy, Toronto, Ontario, Canada
 Pineywoods Community Academy, a charter school district in Lufkin, Texas
 Plano Christian Academy
 Prestonwood Christian Academy, Plano, Texas
 Providence Christian Academy (disambiguation), for multiple schools

Games 
 PokerStars Caribbean Adventure, European Poker Tour event
 Professional Chess Association, from 1993 to 1996

Political parties 
 Parti Communiste Algérien (Algerian Communist Party)
 Partido Comunista de Andalucía (Communist Party of Andalusia)
 Partido Comunista de Aragón (Communist Party of Aragon)
 Partido Comunista de la Argentina (Communist Party of Argentina)

Religion 
 Presbyterian Church of Africa
 Presbyterian Church in America
 Presbyterian Church of Australia

Sports 
 Peace Curling Association, the regional governing body for the sport of curling in the Peace River region of Northern Alberta prior to 2018
 Positive Coaching Alliance, US, provides sports training workshops
 Professional Cricketers' Association, England and Wales
 Punjab Cricket Association
 Punjab Cricket Association Stadium, Mohali, India

Other 
 Permanent Court of Arbitration, The Hague, Netherlands
 Several Police complaints authorities
 Porsche Club of America
 POSC Caesar Association, a standardization organization
 Predator Conservation Alliance, Bozeman, Montana, US
 Production Code Administration, a division of the Motion Picture Association of America
 Progressive Citizens of America
Progressive Cultural Association, a British political music group

Science and technology 
 para-Chloroamphetamine or 4-Chloroamphetamine
 Principal component analysis, a statistical procedure
 Printed circuit assembly or printed circuit board
 Probabilistic cellular automaton (Math/Stochastic Processes)
 Protocatechuic acid, a polyphenol antioxidant
 Pyroglutamic acid, an amino acid derivative

Computers 
 Physical configuration audit, in configuration management
 Polymorphous Computer Architectures, a DARPA project; see Josep Torrellas

Other uses 
 Personal carbon allowance, for carbon dioxide emissions
 Prompt Corrective Action, US banking law